The Electronic Securities Information System (ESIS) was Saudi Arabia's stock exchange until it was replaced by Tadawul in 2001.  ESIS was introduced in 1990 and administered by the Saudi Arabian Monetary Agency (SAMA).

See also
 Tadawul

External links
 Tadawul site

Economy of Saudi Arabia
Stock exchanges in Asia